Rajendra Prasad (1884–1963) was the first President of India.

Rajendra Prasad may also refer to:

 Rajendra Prasad (actor) (born 1956), Indian actor in Telugu cinema
 Rajendra Prasad (boxer) (born 1968), boxer from India
 Rajendra Prasad (filmmaker) (born 1966), Indian cinematographer, writer, director and producer
 Rajendra Prasad (pulmonologist), chest physician and professor of pulmonary medicine
 Rajendra Prasad Shukla (1930–2006), politician from Madhya Pradesh
 K. P. Rajendra Prasad, Indian politician from Tamil Nadu
 V. B. Rajendra Prasad (1932–2015), Indian film producer in Telugu cinema
 Rajendra Persaud (born 1963), English consultant psychiatrist, broadcaster and author of books about psychiatry